"Hot Mess" is a debut song recorded by American country music artist Tyler Farr. It was released in February 2012 as the first single from his debut album, Redneck Crazy. It was written by Dallas Davidson, Rhett Akins and Ben Hayslip. The song peaked at number 49 on the Billboard Hot Country Songs chart.

Critical reception
Billy Dukes of Taste of Country gave the song four stars out of five, saying that "Perhaps the generic production could be a point of criticism, but for a debut single it’s best to keep it short and sweet" In 2017, Billboard contributor Chuck Dauphin placed "Hot Mess" at number seven on his top 10 list of Farr's best songs.

Chart performance

References

2012 debut singles
2012 songs
Tyler Farr songs
BNA Records singles
Song recordings produced by Julian King (recording engineer)
Songs written by The Peach Pickers